John Hervey, 1st Earl of Bristol (27 August 1665 – 20 January 1751) was an English politician.

John Hervey was born in Bury St Edmunds, Suffolk, the son of Sir Thomas Hervey. He was educated in Bury and at Clare College, Cambridge. He became one of the two Members of Parliament for the town five years after his father in March 1694.

In March 1703 he was created 1st Baron Hervey, of Ickworth in the county of Suffolk, and in October 1714 was created 1st Earl of Bristol as a reward for his zeal in promoting the principles of the revolution and supporting the Hanoverian succession.

Estates
The principal estate owned by John Hervey was Ickworth which his ancestor Thomas Hervey (d. 1467) acquired following his marriage to Jane Drury, the sole heiress to Henry Drury. However when he married Elizabeth Felton, he acquired property in other parts of Suffolk: Tuddenham, Playford and Shotley following the death of her father Sir Thomas Felton, 4th Baronet in 1709.

Marriages and issue
Lord Bristol married twice:
to Isabella (died 1693), daughter of Sir Robert Carr, 3rd Baronet, of Sleaford, Lincolnshire
 25 July 1695, Boxted Hall in Suffolk, to Elizabeth (died 1741), daughter and co-heir of local Suffolk dignitary Sir Thomas Felton, 4th Baronet and his noble wife styled from birth Lady Elizabeth, daughter and co-heir of James Howard, 3rd Earl of Suffolk.

By his marriage to Isabella he had three children:
 Isabella Hervey (died November 1711), unmarried
 Carr Hervey, Lord Hervey (1691–1723), who was educated at Clare College, Cambridge and was an MP for the same seat as his father and grandfather from 1713 to 1722. He died unmarried on 14 November 1723.
 Catherine Hervey (b. 1693), died young

By his marriage to Lady Elizabeth he had seventeen children:
 Lady Elizabeth Hervey (1698–1727), married Bussy Mansel, without issue
 John Hervey, 2nd Baron Hervey (1696–1743), was a politician, court wit and pamphleteer. On the death of his half-brother Carr in 1723 he took the courtesy title of Lord Hervey and gained some renown both as a writer and in politics. In 1733, he was summoned to the House of Lords through a writ of acceleration in his father's junior title of Baron Hervey. He also predeceased his father.
 Thomas Hervey (20 January 1699 – 16 January 1775), was one of the members for Bury from 1733 to 1747; held various offices at court; and eloped with Elizabeth, wife of  Sir Thomas Hanmer, 4th Baronet. He had very poor health, and his reckless life frequently brought him into pecuniary and other difficulties. He wrote numerous pamphlets, and when he died Dr. Johnson said of him, "Tom Hervey, though a vicious man [ie a man of vice], was one of the genteelest men who ever lived".

 Capt. William Hervey, RN (25 December 1699 – January 1776), married Elizabeth Ridge and had issue
 Rev. Henry Hervey (5 January 1701 – 16 November 1748); married Catherine Aston, assumed her surname, and had issue
 Rev. Charles Hervey (5 April 1703 – 21 March 1783), prebendary of Ely
 Henrietta Hervey (5 April 1703 – April 1712)
 A stillborn son, 6 July 1704
 James Porter Hervey (24 June 1706 – August 1706)
 Lady Anne Hervey (c. 1707 – 15 July 1771)
 Lady Barbara Hervey (c. 1707 – 25 July 1727)
 Humphrey Hervey (b. 3 June 1708), died young
 Felton Hervey (3 July 1710 – 16 July 1710)
 Felton Hervey (1712–1773), was also Member of Parliament for the family borough of Bury St Edmunds. He appears in the foreground of Zoffany's "The Tribuna of the Uffizi." Having assumed the additional name of Bathurst, Felton's grandson, Felton Elwell Hervey-Bathurst (1782–1819), was created a baronet in 1818, and on his death a year later the title descended to his brother, Frederick Anne Hervey-Bathurst (1783–1824).
 James Hervey (5 March 1713 – May 1714)
 Lady Louisa Carolina Isabella Hervey (1715 – 11 May 1770), married Sir Robert Smyth, 2nd Baronet and had issue
 Lady Henrietta Hervey (25 September 1716 – July 1732)

When John Hervey, 1st Earl of Bristol,  died in January 1751, the earldom of Bristol and the barony of Hervey, along with the estates of Ickworth House, passed to his grandson George, the eldest son of John, Lord Hervey.

References

 

1665 births
1751 deaths
101
Alumni of Clare College, Cambridge
Politicians from Bury St Edmunds
John Hervey, 1st Earl of Bristol
English MPs 1690–1695
English MPs 1695–1698
English MPs 1698–1700
English MPs 1701
English MPs 1701–1702
English MPs 1702–1705
Peers of England created by Queen Anne